Kim Lukas is an English pop singer, dancer and theatrical actress based in Italy, known for the song "All I Really Want" charting in several European countries.

Early life
Lukas spent her first 13 years with her family in Surrey, England.

Theatre
She had an early interest in art, and was involved in Drama Clubs for two years at the Morris Dancer. She studied for 2 years at a performing arts college, where she earned a BTEC Extended Diploma. She went on to study a further three years at Academy of Live and Recorded Arts in London. After some initial theatrical experience, she would interpret Puck in a production of A Midsummer Night's Dream by the English Shakespeare Company.

Musical career
Lukas's father was very passionate about music and that would inspire her to listen to musical bands like The Beatles and artists such as Bob Dylan. She also loves pop music, and her favourite groups and artists were Duran Duran, Madonna and Five Star. The time she was 12 years old would be her first time performing in a television broadcast of the show Blue Peter, where she sang Hark the Herald Angels Sing.

Lukas met Dbone music through her producer, Roberto Turatti, in which her first single, "All I Really Want", would be sent to the company. Kim Lukas states on the lyrics of the song, "Most of my lyrics are based on general situations that people experience but also some of my own personal experiences." The song was a commercial success, reaching the top 10 in Austria, Canada, Denmark, and Italy, and Kim considered the success of the song to be "a dream at the time".

Lukas has also written lyrics for numerous dance acts including Sagei Rei, and Hard in Tango.

In 2002, Lukas presented on Gay TV's European Top 20.

In 1999, Lukas met with singer Nathalie, who would together often meet up at radio festivals for work. They were also with Neja as part of the project Girls Party. Producer Massimo Perini suggested a duet for the two as they both wanted to work together. The song was titled Change The World and it was released by Ritmica Records in 2007. Another collaboration with the two was titled Breathe Again and released by Inner Records on 12 July 2011.

Lukas continued to perform her shows in Italy and often in Spain, too.

Personal life
Lukas has an interest in reading books, especially biographies, and attend concerts, festivals and various kinds of musical performances to buy a lot of music. She has an older brother, Luke, who currently lives in Málaga, Spain.

Discography

Studio albums
With a K (2000)

Singles

As featured artist
2011: "One More Day" with Simon de Jano

Notes

References

External links

1977 births
Living people
People from Surrey
People from Thornton-Cleveleys
Alumni of the Academy of Live and Recorded Arts
21st-century English women singers
21st-century English singers